Vakhtang Ionovich Koridze (born 24 December 1949 in Batumi) is a retired Georgian and Soviet football player. He was an integral member of the FC Dinamo Tbilisi side that won the Soviet league championship in 1978 and eliminated Liverpool in the European Cup the following year.

Career statistics

Club

Honours
 Soviet Top League winner: 1978 
Soviet Cup (2): 1976, 1979

International career
Koridze made his debut for USSR on 28 March 1979 in a friendly against Bulgaria. He played in a UEFA Euro 1980 qualifier against Hungary and scored a goal in a friendly against Czechoslovakia.

References

External links
 
  Profile and statistics at FootballFacts.ru
  Profile and statistics at Rusteam.Permian.ru

1949 births
Living people
Footballers from Georgia (country)
Soviet footballers
Soviet Union international footballers
Soviet Top League players
FC Dinamo Tbilisi players
FC Guria Lanchkhuti players
Sportspeople from Batumi
FC Dinamo Batumi players
Association football defenders
Association football midfielders